Anderson Simas Luciano (born 11 April 1976), commonly known as Tcheco, is a Brazilian football coach and former player who played as an attacking midfielder. He is the current head coach of Azuriz.

He was appointed coach of Coritiba in August 2018.

Honours

Player
Paraná
Campeonato Paranaense: 1997

Coritiba
Campeonato Paranaense: 2003, 2011, 2012
Campeonato Brasileiro Série B: 2010

Al Ittihad
AFC Champions League: 2004, 2005
Saudi Crown Prince Cup: 2004
Arab Champions League: 2005

Grêmio
Campeonato Gaúcho: 2006, 2007

References

External links
 sambafoot
 CBF
 zerozero.pt
 Guardian Stats Centre
 globoesporte
 gremio.net

Living people
1976 births
Footballers from Curitiba
Brazilian footballers
Brazilian football managers
Brazilian expatriate footballers
Campeonato Brasileiro Série A players
Campeonato Brasileiro Série A managers
Campeonato Brasileiro Série B managers
Expatriate footballers in Saudi Arabia
Paraná Clube players
Clube Esportivo Bento Gonçalves players
J. Malucelli Futebol players
Coritiba Foot Ball Club players
Ittihad FC players
Santos FC players
Grêmio Foot-Ball Porto Alegrense players
Sport Club Corinthians Paulista players
Coritiba Foot Ball Club managers
Rio Branco Sport Club managers
FC Cascavel managers

Association football midfielders